Yalıncak  is a town in the central district (Trabzon) of  Trabzon Province, Turkey. It is situated to the east of Trabzon at. The population of the town is 3231   as of 2011. In 1995 it was declared a seat of township. Main agricultural products are watermelon, tomato and nut. Some Yalıncak residents work in nearby Trabzon.

References

Populated places in Trabzon Province
Towns in Turkey
Ortahisar
Populated coastal places in Turkey